Niceville is a city in Okaloosa County, Florida, United States, located near Eglin Air Force Base on Boggy Bayou that opens into Choctawhatchee Bay.

The population was 11,684 at the 2000 census. The 2010 census population for Niceville was 12,749.

Niceville is part of the Fort Walton Beach–Crestview–Destin Metropolitan Statistical Area.

History
When mail service began on July 21, 1868, the city was known as Boggy, and on November 5, 1910, the name was officially changed to Niceville. The name Niceville was selected by the postmaster's daughter. In 1915, Niceville became part of newly formed Okaloosa County after previously being in Walton County. It is a twin city along with Valparaiso, which borders it on the west side of the city.

Geography

Climate

Demographics

As of census of 2000, there were 11,684 people, 4,637 households, and 3,385 families living in the city. The racial makeup of the city was 87.25% White, 4.58% African American, 0.74% Native American, 3.20% Asian, 0.11% Pacific Islander, 1.14% from other races, and 2.99% from two or more races. Hispanic or Latino of any race were 3.71% of the population.

Of the 4,637 households 31.5% had children under the age of 18 living with them, 59.3% were married couples living together, 10.0% had a female householder with no husband present, and 27.0% were non-families. 21.8% of households were one person and 7.8% were one person aged 65 or older. The average household size was 2.49 and the average family size was 2.89.

The age distribution was 23.0% under the age of 18, 9.4% from 18 to 24, 27.4% from 25 to 44, 27.2% from 45 to 64, and 12.9% 65 or older. The median age was 39 years. For every 100 females, there were 97.3 males. For every 100 females age 18 and over, there were 94.1 males.

The median household income was $45,685 and the median family income  was $51,627. Males had a median income of $34,583 versus $20,987 for females. The per capita income for the city was $20,175. About 7.2% of families and 9.6% of the population were below the poverty line, including 13.8% of those under age 18 and 9.4% of those age 65 or over.

Schools
 Bluewater Elementary
 Lula J. Edge Elementary
 James E. Plew Elementary
 C.W. Ruckel Middle School
 Addie R. Lewis Middle School
 Niceville High School
 Collegiate High School at Northwest Florida State College
 Northwest Florida State College
 Rocky Bayou Christian School

Arts and culture
The Boggy Fest, previously known as the Boggy Bayou Mullet Festival, was held annually in Niceville.

Notable people

 Anna Banks, author
 Louis C. Menetrey, Army general
 Jason Craig, comic book artist
 Roy Finch, football player
 Shin Hyun-joon, South Korean diplomat, military officer and the first Commandant of the Republic of Korea Marine Corps, retired here
 Jarret Johnson, football player
 Cris Judd, actor
 Jimmy Nelson, baseball pitcher
 Pam Oliver, sportscaster
 Julian Pittman, football player
 Alan Ritchson, actor
 Tony Sipp, baseball player
 Toby Turner, Youtuber known as Tobuscus
 Conrad Ricamora, actor

References

External links

 
 boggyflora.com
 Northwest Florida Daily News

Cities in Okaloosa County, Florida
Cities in Florida
Populated places on the Intracoastal Waterway in Florida